Hugo Goossen (born 15 October 1963) is a Surinamese former swimmer. He competed in the men's 100 metre backstroke at the 1984 Summer Olympics. He also represented Suriname at the 1982 Central American and Caribbean Games in Havana and at the 1983 Pan American Games in Caracas. Born in the Netherlands, he came to Suriname when he was six months old and spent the next few years in Moengo. In 1969 his family moved to Paramaribo and Goossen joined the 'Dolfijn' swim club. Goossen studied at the Delft University of Technology and later worked as a communications engineer in Qatar.

References

External links
 

1963 births
Living people
Surinamese male swimmers
Olympic swimmers of Suriname
Swimmers at the 1984 Summer Olympics
Pan American Games competitors for Suriname
Swimmers at the 1983 Pan American Games
Competitors at the 1982 Central American and Caribbean Games
Sportspeople from Paramaribo
Place of birth missing (living people)
Delft University of Technology alumni
Surinamese expatriates in Qatar